Jody Kreiman is an American linguist and professor in residence of head and neck surgery at the University of California, Los Angeles. She is known for her works on phonetics and laboratory phonology. She is an elected fellow of the Acoustical Society of America.

References

External links
Kreiman at the UCLA

American phonologists
Living people
Linguists from the United States
Year of birth missing (living people)
University of California, Los Angeles faculty
Phoneticians
David Geffen School of Medicine at UCLA alumni
University of Chicago alumni